Emanuel Augustus (born Emanuel Ya'kov Burton, January 2, 1975), is an American former professional boxer from Brownsville, Texas who competed from 1994 to 2011. He was known his entertaining boxing style and showboating manner designed to confuse opponents. He faced top-level competition throughout his career, winning the IBA light welterweight title in 2004.

Early life
Born in Chicago, Illinois, Augustus (born as Burton) grew up in Louisiana and boxed out of Baton Rouge.

Professional career
Augustus began boxing at age 17 under his birth name Emanuel Burton. In 2001, when his parents married, Burton adopted his father's last name of Augustus. He retained the nickname "YA", short for his middle name Ya'kov. Emanuel has frequently appeared on ESPN2's boxing programs Tuesday Night Fights and its counterpart Friday Night Fights.

Augustus's televised bouts garnered him a cult following, in part due to his unique style and flair in the ring, and his willingness to take on all comers, taking fights on short notice as a last minute replacement  even in opponents' hometowns.  Augustus frequently clowned in the ring to frustrate his opponents, engaging in his trademark "string-puppet dance."  Augustus was also known for losing close controversial decisions on the road.

Augustus achieved a measure of fame after his bout against Courtney Burton on July 6, 2004, which he lost by controversial close decision. The state of Michigan investigated the points verdict for Burton, but did not overturn the result. Augustus demanded a rematch, and got it,  avenging his loss to Burton on September 1, 2006, when he stopped Burton in the eighth round on ESPN with the help of a left hook to the body. This was the opposite of result in their first fight, when Augustus was disallowed a knockdown from a left hook to the body after referee Dan Kelley incorrectly claimed the knockdown was a caused by an illegal low blow. The punch should have been permitted, because it actually landed on Burton's beltline, which is termed 'the border' in professional boxing refereeing.

The best win of Augustus' career ratings wise was against Carlos Wilfredo Vilches on July 19, 2002.  Augustus took the fight on just 2 days' notice after Vilches' original opponent, Vince Phillips, pulled out due to injury.  Vilches was 37-1-2 at the time and was a ranked fighter.  During the bout, Vilches wanted to keep Augustus at bay with a stiff jab. Augustus continued to pressure Vilches, and landed counter right hands over the top of Vilches' left jab.  A cut opened up near the left eye of Vilches, which eventually resulted in an upset eighth round stoppage win for Augustus.  The win vaulted Augustus to the number two worldwide ratings position in the International boxing Federation light welterweight division. However, Augustus followed with four decision losses and one controversial draw to tough opponents, including Omar Gabriel Weis, over whom Vilches already held a victory.

At least one of Augustus' losses was questionable. On June 6, 1999, Danish boxer Allan Vester won his bout with Augustus with one second left in the twelfth and final round. Augustus was knocked down by a flurry of punches which occurred in the final seconds of the bout, and did not get up in time. Augustus later admitted he gave up out of frustration near the end of the bout, stating, "I just felt out of order, out of place."

Titles
On April 2, 2004, Augustus became the IBA light welterweight champion defeating Alex Trujillo by unanimous decision.

On December 9, 2006, he became the WBC Continental Americas light welterweight champion by defeating Russell Stoner Jones.

On July 4, 2008, he knocked out Jakkirt Suwunnalirt in Sydney, Australia, to win the WBO Oriental welterweight title.

Controversial disqualification
Augustus was the IBA light welterweight champion between April 2, 2004, and June 18 of that year. Augustus lost his title when referee Laurence Cole disqualified him in his first title defense against Tomas Barrientes. At the time of disqualification, Augustus was ahead on all three judges' scorecards. He was disqualified for pushing, talking back to the referee, and not looking into his eyes when asked to.

Other achievements
His fight against "Irish" Micky Ward on July 13, 2001, was voted 2001 ESPN "Fight of the Year", as well as 2001 Ring magazine Fight of the Year. In June 2008 ESPN announced that this fight had been nominated for its "Fight of the Decade" award.  Augustus was also named "ESPN's Most Memorable Fighter".

Outside the ring
During a 2012 interview with boxing expert Dan Rafael, Floyd Mayweather Jr. stated Augustus was the toughest opponent he had faced in his career.

On the night of October 13, 2014, Augustus was critically wounded after being hit in the back of the head by a random gunshot and was on life support. Baton Rouge Police named 21-year-old Christopher Stills as a suspect in the crime, but subsequently dropped charges due to lack of witnesses or evidence of intent, as Stills was alleged to have fired a gun several times in the air but not at a target. Augustus eventually recovered, and was living with his sister in Baton Rouge. As of 2016, Augustus was engaged to be married, was in improved health and spirits, and had returned in training.

Professional boxing record

Notable opponents
As a journeyman Augustus faced top talent his whole career and has an outstanding resume when it comes to experiencing the best the sport has to offer.

 In just his 10th professional fight faced Jesus Chavez and was TKO'd in the 7th round.
 Lost a 10 round UD against Pete Taliaferro.
 Took a short notice fight against Ivan Robinson and almost threw off Robinson's title aspirations (L10).
 Won a tight MD over Wilfredo Negron.
 Fought Diosbelys Hurtado on short notice (L10).
 TKO'd England's Jon Thaxton after taking the fight on short notice.
 Lost a 12-round decision to Antonio Diaz.
 Lost a controversial 12-round decision to Teddy Reid.
 Fought John John Molina (L10).
 TKO'd by Floyd Mayweather Jr. in the 9th round after his corner threw in the towel.  Mayweather maintains to this day that Augustus was one of his toughest opponents.
 Took part in 2001's fight of the year against Micky Ward (L10). Ward maintains that Augustus, along with Arturo Gatti, was one of the toughest men he ever fought.
 Fought Romania's Leonard Doroftei (aka Leo Dorin, L10).
 Drew with the late Leavander Johnson.
 Upset Carlos Wilfredo Vilches with a TKO win.
 Lost a 10-round decision to Omar Weis.
 Lost a 10-round decision to Kelson Pinto on short notice.
 Lost an 8-round decision to David Diaz.
 Dominated in a 12-round win over Alex Trujillo.
 Stopped Ray Oliveira in 8 rounds.
 Lost an exciting 12-round UD to Herman Ngoudjo.
 Took a short notice fight against hard hitting prospect Ruslan Provodnikov and was TKO'd in the 9th round.
 Lost to Vernon Paris (L8) in his last ever fight.

References

External links
Official Emanuel Augustus YouTube Page
 
Augustus interviewed in 2005
Augustus chat plus fight clips October 2006

|-

|-

|-

|-

|-

1975 births
Living people
Boxers from Chicago
Boxers from Louisiana
Light-welterweight boxers
American expatriate sportspeople in Australia
American male boxers
African-American boxers
American shooting survivors
21st-century African-American sportspeople
20th-century African-American sportspeople